Kathrina Salaiau (born 29 September 1976) is a Papua New Guinean former footballer who played as a defender. Nicknamed Cathy, she has been a member of the Papua New Guinea women's national team.

International career
Salaiau capped for Papua New Guinea at senior level during the 2010 OFC Women's Championship.

References

1976 births
Living people
Papua New Guinean women's footballers
Women's association football defenders
Papua New Guinea women's international footballers